Otto II (also Otho, Ottone, or Oddone) (c. 1015 – 20 November 1084) was the fourth Marquis of Montferrat from 1042 until his death. He was a member of the Aleramid dynasty.

Life
Otto was the son and successor of William III and Waza. After his father's death in 1042, Otto ruled the March of Montferrat alongside his younger brother, Henry of Montferrat until Henry's death, c.1045. Thereafter, Otto ruled alone until his own death in 1084.

He married Constance of Savoy, daughter of Amadeus II of Savoy. He was succeeded by their son William IV. His second son Henry was the founder of the dynasty of the Marquiss of Occimiano.

Sources
Schwennicke, Detlev. Europäische Stammtafeln: Stammtafeln zur Geschichte der Europäischen Staaten. Marburg: Verlag von J. A. Stargardt, 1978. (in German)

External links

Oddone II at Marchesi Monferrato (in Italian)
Otto II, Margraf von Montferrat (1042–1084) (in German)

1010s births
1084 deaths
Marquesses of Montferrat
11th-century Italian nobility
Aleramici
Year of birth uncertain